William Irvin Matthews (born November 5, 1983) is an American Christian musician. He started his music career in 2011, with the release of Hope's Anthem, by Bethel Music alongside Kingsway Music.

Early life
Matthews was born William Irvin Matthews on November 5, 1983, in the city of Detroit to a father who was a preacher and a mother who was a choir director. At 12 years old, he moved with his family to Raleigh, North Carolina, where he started honing his acumen as a songwriter. His baptism occurred when he was 18 years old. He moved to Kansas City, Missouri for the first part of 2007, where he attended worship services at International House of Prayer. Subsequently, he relocated later that year to Redding, California at the request of Kim Walker-Smith, where he met Brian and Jenn Johnson. Matthews ended up loving the church for its worship program, and remained a member of Bethel Church for several years.

In 2014, Matthews left Bethel Church after six years, citing creative exploration and a desire to move in a new direction. Matthews remained on the Bethel Music label post-departure contributing to the Bethel Music compilation album Have it All (Live). On November 29, 2016, Bethel Music released a statement via their November newsletter and also on their website communicating, "As of June 13, 2016, Bethel Music and William Matthews have agreed that William will no longer be affiliated with Bethel Music, and William will no longer be in leadership within any of the worship communities at Bethel Church." Matthews later explained, "As a worship leader, you have to be all things for all people; you're not an artist... I'd rather be an artist than a worship leader."

Music career
His music recording career commenced in 2011 with the album, Hope's Anthem, released on July 26, 2011, by Bethel Music alongside Kingsway Music. The album was his breakthrough release upon the Billboard charts, where it placed at No. 27 on the Christian Albums chart and No. 19 on the Heatseekers Albums chart.

Discography

References

External links
 
 Bethel Music profile

1983 births
Living people
African-American songwriters
African-American Christians
Musicians from Detroit
Musicians from Raleigh, North Carolina
Musicians from Kansas City, Missouri
Musicians from California
Songwriters from Michigan
Songwriters from North Carolina
Songwriters from Missouri
Songwriters from California